The National Shrine of the Divine Mercy (Filipino: Pambansáng Dambana ng Dakilang Awa ng Diyos) is a church dedicated to the Divine Mercy in Marilao, Bulacan, the Philippines. It was elevated to the status of National Shrine by Archbishop Orlando Quevedo of the Catholic Bishops Conference of the Philippines. The first Mass was held at the site on February 2, 1992, the Feast of the Presentation.

Features
At the back of the church is a model of Calvary with life-sized statues of the Stations of the Cross. The Guadalupe Chapel at the church basement where the picture of Our Lady is enthroned with its flowing water that many pilgrims consider healing. The Rosary Hill, Grotto of Our Lady of Lourdes where people can pray for good health, the Grotto of the Resurrection for long as they hear the water gush from the falls, the Saint Faustina Hall, an auditorium where Sunday Masses are held due to the large population of devotees in the shrine. The Shrine offers the Little Poland Museum that feature depictions of the house and basement where Pope John Paul II lived, the Chapel where Faustina Kowalska had a vision of the Divine Mercy and the prison cell of Maximillian Kolbe where he was martyred.

See also
 Saint Faustyna Kowalska
 Divine Mercy Shrine (Misamis Oriental)
 Church of Saint Mary of the Mongols

References

External links
 

Catholic pilgrimage sites
Roman Catholic churches in Bulacan
Roman Catholic national shrines in the Philippines
Divine Mercy
Churches in the Roman Catholic Diocese of Malolos